Michael Wayne Hubbard (born February 16, 1971 in Lynchburg, Virginia) is a retired American baseball player who played catcher in the Major Leagues from 1995 to 2001. He played for the Montreal Expos, Chicago Cubs, Texas Rangers, and Atlanta Braves.

References

External links

1971 births
Living people
American expatriate baseball players in Canada
Atlanta Braves players
Baseball players from Virginia
Chicago Cubs players
Daytona Cubs players
Geneva Cubs players
Iowa Cubs players
James Madison Dukes baseball players
Louisville RiverBats players
Major League Baseball catchers
Montreal Expos players
Oklahoma RedHawks players
Orlando Cubs players
Ottawa Lynx players
Richmond Braves players
Rochester Red Wings players
Sportspeople from Lynchburg, Virginia
Texas Rangers players